Ciro Paulino "Palic" Castillo Valerio (born 7 September 1965) is a retired Honduran football player who played for the national team in the 1990s.

Club career
Nicknamed Palic, Castillo scored 35 league goals for Honduran side Marathón and another 13 with Real España over a 10-year period. He also scored 10 goals in 76 games in the Costa Rican league with Alajuelense and Cartaginés.

International career
Castillo made his debut for Honduras in a May 1991 UNCAF Nations Cup match against Panama and has earned a total of 9 caps, scoring 1 goal. He has represented his country at that one tournament, the 1991 UNCAF Nations Cup.

His final international was a January 1993 friendly match against Bolivia.

Retirement
In June 2010, Castillo rejoined his old club Marathón to become a reserves trainer and talent scout.

References

1965 births
Living people
Association football forwards
Honduran footballers
Honduras international footballers
C.D. Marathón players
Real C.D. España players
L.D. Alajuelense footballers
C.S. Cartaginés players
Liga FPD players
Honduran expatriate footballers
Expatriate footballers in Costa Rica
Liga Nacional de Fútbol Profesional de Honduras players